The 2018 Ecuador Open Quito was an ATP men's tennis tournament played on outdoor clay courts. It was the 4th edition of the Ecuador Open Quito as part of the ATP World Tour 250 series of the 2018 ATP World Tour. It took place in Quito, Ecuador from 5 February through 11 February 2018. Roberto Carballés Baena won the singles title.

Points and prize money

Point distribution

Prize money

Singles main draw entrants

Seeds 

 1 Rankings are as of January 29, 2018.

Other entrants 
The following players received wildcards into the singles main draw:
  Corentin Moutet
  Roberto Quiroz
  Tommy Robredo

The following players received entry using a protected ranking:
  Pablo Andújar

The following players received entry from the qualifying draw:
  Facundo Bagnis 
  Roberto Carballés Baena 
  Federico Gaio
  Andrej Martin

The following player received entry as a lucky loser:
  Alessandro Giannessi

Withdrawals 
Before the tournament
  Alexandr Dolgopolov → replaced by  Casper Ruud
  Nicolás Kicker → replaced by  Peter Polansky
  Tommy Robredo → replaced by  Alessandro Giannessi
  Tennys Sandgren → replaced by  Stefano Travaglia

Doubles main draw entrants

Seeds 

 1 Rankings are as of January 29, 2018.

Other entrants 
The following pairs received wildcards into the doubles main draw:
  Dorian Descloix /  Gaël Monfils 
  Gonzalo Escobar /  Roberto Quiroz

The following pairs received entry as alternates:
  Facundo Bagnis /  João Souza
  Federico Gaio /  Andrej Martin
  Sergio Galdós /  Gerald Melzer

Withdrawals
Before the tournament
  Carlos Berlocq (right shoulder injury)
  Rogério Dutra Silva (enteritis)
  André Sá (right calf strain)

Finals

Singles 

  Roberto Carballés Baena defeated  Albert Ramos Viñolas, 6–3, 4–6, 6–4

Doubles

  Nicolás Jarry /  Hans Podlipnik-Castillo defeated  Austin Krajicek /  Jackson Withrow, 7–6(8–6), 6–3

References

External links 
 

Ecuador Open Quito
Ecuador Open (tennis)
Ecuador Open Quito